Courtney Bernadette Dolehide (born March 25, 1992) is an American former professional tennis player.

Dolehide was raised in Hinsdale, a suburb of Chicago, where she attended Hinsdale Central High School.

While still a high school senior she received a wildcard to compete in the doubles main draw of the 2009 US Open (with Kristie Ahn), following a runner-up finish at the USTA Girls' 18 national hardcourt doubles championships. The pair fell in the first round to eighth seeds Bethanie Mattek-Sands and Nadia Petrova.

From 2009 to 2010 she featured on the professional tour and reached a highest singles ranking of 453 in the world. She had a win over top-100 player Patricia Mayr of Austria and was a finalist at an ITF tournament in Wichita.

Dolehide went to UCLA on a scholarship and in 2012 earned All-American honors for doubles. She was team captain of the Bruins when they claimed the 2014 NCAA championship.

Her younger sister Caroline is also a tennis player and she has a cousin, Tom Gorzelanny, who played Major League Baseball.

ITF finals

Singles: 1 (0–1)

Doubles: 1 (0–1)

References

External links
 
 

1992 births
Living people
American female tennis players
UCLA Bruins women's tennis players
Tennis players from Chicago
People from Hinsdale, Illinois